Holkham Camp, or Holkham Fort, is an Iron Age fort in Norfolk, England, about  north-west of the village of Holkham. It is a scheduled monument.

Location and description
It is in the Holkham National Nature Reserve, at the southern end of a sandy spit, with coastal dunes to the north and tidal wetlands on the other sides. The site is not normally accessible on foot; it can be seen from an elevated bird hide on the edge of woods to the north.

The western side is protected by a slope, and by a creek on the south-west. The eastern side has a single rampart and ditch, with an additional outer bank at the south-east.

History
During the Iron Age and Roman era, the site was in the area of the Iceni tribe. Holkham Camp is one of two possible sites (the other being Stonea Camp in the Cambridgeshire fens) corresponding to the description by the Roman historian Tacitus of the location of the defeat in AD 47 of Iceni rebels by a Roman force commanded by Ostorius Scapula.

The site may have been a feature in Mesolithic and Neolithic times, since finds include worked flints from these periods; they are thought to have been in their original location, as the site has not been ploughed.

See also
 Hillforts in Britain

References

External links
 Holkham Nature Reserve

Hill forts in Norfolk
Scheduled monuments in Norfolk
Holkham